The 2011–12 Ukrainian Second League was the 21st season of 3rd level professional football in Ukraine. There are two groups of competition divided by region. Both Group competitions began on July 23, 2011. The competition had a winter break from November 6, 2012 and until April 2, 2012. The group competitions will complete on 28 May 2012. The championship game was played between the top teams of each group competition on 2 June 2012.

Competition information
Note: Relegation from the League is not covered by the current regulations

The placing of teams in the table is done in the following order:
 number of accumulated points
 difference(GD) between goals for(GF) and goals allowed(GA)
 number of goals for
 The League Fair-play ranking

The next tie-break is a simple draw.

Team changes

Admitted teams

The following teams were admitted by the PFL after playing at the 2011 Ukrainian Football Amateur League and passing attestation.

Krystal Kherson – initial group stage (returning after an absence of five seasons)
FC Sevastopol-2 Sevastopol – UPL youth competitions (returning after an absence of three seasons)
Makiyivvuhillya Makiyivka – initial group stage (debut)
Myr Hornostayivka – initial group stage (debut)
Real Pharm Yuzhne – initial group stage (debut)
SKAD-Yalpuh Bolhrad – initial group stage (debut)
UkrAhroKom Pryiutivka – initial group stage (debut)
Slavutych Cherkasy – initial group stage (debut)
Avanhard Kramatorsk – initial group stage (returning after an absence of 42 seasons, since 1969)

Relegated teams

Prykarpattya Ivano-Frankivsk – (returning after an absence of four seasons)
 FSC Prykarpattia Ivano-Frankivsk is regarded a successor of FC Fakel Ivano-Frankivsk.

Group A

Location map

Standings

Withdrawn Teams

Chornomorets-2 Odesa 
On 7 January the Football Club Chornomorets Odesa informed the PFL that they ceased operations of their third team Chornomorets-2 Odesa and withdrew it from the League during the mid-winter break (after Round 16). The PFL officially acknowledged the communication from the club on 11 January 2012. All of their spring fixtures are considered technical losses. The club played sixteen games in the League and had a record of 5 wins, 5 draws and 6 losses with 19 goals scored and 20 allowed.

SKAD-Yalpuh Bolhrad 
On 4 April the PFL removed SKAD-Yalpuh Bolhrad from the competition due to deficient financial funding of the club. All of their spring fixtures are considered technical losses. The club played sixteen games in the League and had a record of 2 wins, 1 draws and 13 losses with 10 goals scored and 54 allowed.

Results

Top scorers

Group B

Location map

Standings

Results

Top scorers

Championship game
A championship game will be played between the top teams of each group competition.

Promotion play-off

A playoff between the two second placed teams will be played with the winner participating in another playoff game between the 16th placed team of the First League for a place in the 2012–13 Ukrainian First League competition.

First Game

Second Game 

Avanhard Kramatorsk promoted to First League after Nyva Vinnystia withdrew from PFL (5 July 2012)

See also

 2011–12 Ukrainian Premier League
 2011–12 Ukrainian First League
 2011–12 Ukrainian Cup

References

Ukrainian Second League seasons
3
Ukr